Aulay Macaulay (died 1788) was the English inventor of a system of shorthand.

Aulay Macaulay may also refer to:

Sir Aulay MacAulay of Ardincaple (died 1617), Scottish chief of the MacAulays of Ardincaple
Aulay Macaulay (writer) (1758–1819), Scottish clergyman of the Church of England
Aulay MacAulay Morrison (1863–1942), Canadian lawyer and politician